Terka  (Terka) is a village in the administrative district of Gmina Solina, within Lesko County, Subcarpathian Voivodeship, in south-eastern Poland.

The village has a population of 190.

References

Terka